Izu Skyline is a toll road through Izu Peninsula in Shizuoka Prefecture. The road measures 40.6 km and leads through mountainous terrain in the eastern part of Izu Peninsula and connects Atami-touge IC near Kannami-cho, Tagata-gun, Shizuoka and Amagi-kougen IC of Atami city.

External links 
 
 Homepage of Izu Skyline road

Toll roads in Japan